Mac's Steak in the Rough is a drive-in fast-food restaurant in Albuquerque, New Mexico, that serves American and New Mexican cuisine. It used to be a chain of restaurants throughout New Mexico, but their locations were reduced to a single restaurant. however in 2012 they expanded again by opening a second location inside the Latitudes gas station near the entrance of Intel in Rio Rancho.

History
Started in 1949 by Dave McCarty in Portales, New Mexico. They opened their first Albuquerque restaurant in the 1960s. They are now owned by the New Mexico-based company, Fresquez Companies.

Today
The restaurant continues to sell its "steak in the rough", which is deep-fried steak fingers with french fries and white gravy, which come with a green onion.

Reception
The restaurant was selected as one of the best drive-in restaurants in the United States by Thrillist.

References

External links

Restaurants established in 1949
Restaurants in Albuquerque, New Mexico
1949 establishments in New Mexico
American companies established in 1945